EMCOR Group is an engineering and construction company based in Norwalk, Connecticut, US.

It comprises 80 or more operating companies, has approximately 170 locations and employs more than 33,000 people. The company was listed as number 375 on the 2018 Fortune 500 list.

History
Emerging in 1994 as a result of the bankruptcy of JWP, Inc., formerly Jamaica Water Properties Inc., EMCOR Group, Inc. has grown through an acquisition strategy focused on broadening company services by branching out into new geographical areas and moving into new markets.

In February 2020, EMCOR Group disclosed a ransomware incident that took down some of its IT systems. The incident was identified as an infection with the Ryuk ransomware strain.

Acquisitions
Acquisitions have been as follows:
 2002, EMCOR acquired the Virginia-based Consolidated Engineering Services Inc. 
 2002, EMCOR acquired 19 companies from Comfort Systems USA. 
2002, EMCOR acquires New England Mechanical Services (NEMSI) 
 2005, EMCOR purchased Fluidics, Inc., a privately held mechanical services company based in Philadelphia, Pennsylvania. 
 2005, EMCOR acquired S.A. Comunale, Inc., a privately held fire protection and mechanical services company headquartered in Akron, Ohio. 
 2007, EMCOR acquired Ohmstede Ltd., the leading heat exchanger services provider in the U.S. 
 2010, EMCOR acquired Scalise Industries, a privately held engineering, facilities maintenance, and service company headquartered in Lawrence, Pennsylvania. 
 2011, EMCOR purchased Bahnson Holdings, Inc., a privately held mechanical construction services company headquartered in Winston-Salem, North Carolina. 
 2013, EMCOR acquired RepconStrickland, Inc., a privately held firm that included five recognized brands with capabilities encompassing turnaround and specialty services, including: shutdowns, overhauls, revamps, capital projects, engineering and constructibility reviews, project management, welding services, refractory services, tower services and emergency repair.
 2016, EMCOR acquired Ardent Services, L.L.C. and Rabalais Constructors, LLC (collectively, "Ardent"), for a purchase price of $205 million in cash. Headquartered in Covington, Louisiana, and Corpus Christi, Texas, Ardent is one of the U.S. industrial and refinery electrical and instrumentation service companies. Ardent provides electrical, process control, equipment installation and automation services for the maintenance, repair, replacement and new construction of energy infrastructure.
 2016, EMCOR acquired Newcomb and Company. Headquartered in Raleigh, North Carolina, Newcomb is a HVAC commercial and industrial mechanical contractor.
 2017, EMCOR acquired CCI Mechanical, Based in West Valley, Utah

Operations
Business units are as follows:
 EMCOR Construction Services
 EMCOR Building Services
 EMCOR Industrial Services
 EMCOR Government Services
 EMCOR Facilities Services

Projects
 B2 Rocket Test Stand at the John C. Stennis Space Center; Hancock County, Mississippi
 Bay Area Rapid Transit (BART) - BART Coliseum/Oakland Airport Station to the Oakland International Airport; Oakland, California
 Caterpillar's Work Tools Campus; Wamego, Kansas
Cayuga Milk Ingredients Manufacturing Facility; Auburn, New York
 Chobani Yogurt Plant; Twin Falls, Idaho
 City of Clearwater Reverse Osmosis Water Treatment Plant; Clearwater, Florida
 Coast Guard Headquarters and Support Facilities; Government Service Administration (GSA) - St. Elizabeth's Campus; Washington, D.C. 
 Consolidated National Operations Center of the U.S. Coast Guard Main Headquarters; Washington D.C. 
 Department of the Navy, Naval Facilities Engineering Command Southwest (NAVFAC); San Diego County, California  
 Directorate of Public Works at Fort Huachuca; Sierra Vista, Arizona
 Electrical Generator Plant - City of West Palm Beach; West Palm Beach, Florida
 Florida Inland Navigation District – Dredged Material Area; Nassau County, Florida
 Georgia Gwinnett College - Allied Health and Science Building; Lawrenceville, Georgia
 Herbert Hoover Dike; Okeechobee and Palm Beach Counties, Florida
 Los Angeles Hall of Justice; Los Angeles, California
 NASA John C. Stennis Space Center; Hancock County, Mississippi 
 National Library - Museum of George Washington's Estate; Mount Vernon, Virginia 
 Northeast Ohio Medical University Health and Wellness Center; Rootstown, Ohio 
 Palm Beach Resource Recovery Corporation - Solid Waste Authority of Palm Beach County; West Palm Beach, Florida

References

Companies based in Norwalk, Connecticut
Companies listed on the New York Stock Exchange